The Invisible Man (Russian: Человек-невидимка) is a television entertainment show of Russian origin aired on TV-3 channel. The show's format is created by Mikhail Krikunenko, Olga Volodina, and Elena Kotunova. The television show is co-produced by AVK Production and Pan-Ars.

The show premiered on 8 February 2013, and has aired with Evelina Bledans as its host until now. This weekly show airs each Friday evening at 7:00 P.M.

The international distributor for the show is Dori Media Group.

Format 
Experts strive to identify each episode's celebrity guest whom they cannot see or communicate with. Unlike the experts, the viewers know the celebrity's name from the start of each episode.

Six experts represent sciences and paranormal fields. These experts are a forensic scientist, psychologist, shaman, fortuneteller, magician, and palm reader. They stay and work in a TV studio.

The experts try to identify the celebrity's features, character, occupation and even his name. Since the experts cannot see or communicate with the celebrity, they must use their unique skills and general knowledge to identify him or her.  They examine materials received from the celebrity: hair, nail pieces, photos of palm lines, scent examples, teeth marks, fingerprints, blood and saliva samples, drawings, completed psychological tests, and dreams.

This show is structured as three phases and a closing round.

The show’s slogan 
You will have enough time to think how well you do know yourself!

Show rounds and rules 
Throughout each episode, the celebrity and his/her support team of friends and relatives stay offstage in two separate studious. They watch everything going on via monitors and can comment on anything at any time.

In the first round, each expert describes the celebrity's appearance: gender, age, height, figure, and hair and eye color. The experts receive the materials they need for their descriptions in advance, so they can study them on their own before studio shooting.

In the second round, each expert works with materials and data he receives in the studio; and has just two minutes to make his conclusions.

In this round the experts reveal the celebrity's secrets, especially about his/her health and life.  The experts also talk about the celebrity's character, hidden inclinations and vices. They talk about the guest's past, his present unrealized talents, and future.

In the third round, the experts receive photos of eleven different celebrities who are similar to the guest plus one of the celebrity. Each expert has one minute to choose and show his choice of the celebrity's photo.

In the closing round, the celebrity appears in front of the experts, enabling them to clarify any controversial and outstanding points.

The Expert Panel 
Victor Kolkutin, Doctor of Medical Science, professor, forensic scientist

Maria Pugacheva, psychologist

Dardo Kusto, shaman

Aida Martirosyan, fortuneteller

Roman Fad, magician and medium

Boris Akimov, palm reader

Season overview

Episode List 

Legend

 — The expert correctly identified the hero of the program, choosing in the third round of his photo

 — The expert incorrectly identified the hero of the program, choosing in the third round photo of another famous person

References 

Russian game shows
2013 Russian television series debuts
2010s Russian television series